In mathematics, the discriminant of a polynomial is a quantity that depends on the coefficients and allows deducing some properties of the roots without computing them. More precisely, it is a polynomial function of the coefficients of the original polynomial. The discriminant is widely used in polynomial factoring, number theory, and algebraic geometry.

The discriminant of the quadratic polynomial  is

the quantity which appears under the square root in the quadratic formula. If  this discriminant is zero if and only if the polynomial has a double root. In the case of real coefficients, it is positive if the polynomial has two distinct real roots, and negative if it has two distinct complex conjugate roots. Similarly, the discriminant of a cubic polynomial is zero if and only if the polynomial has a multiple root. In the case of a cubic with real coefficients, the discriminant is positive if the polynomial has three distinct real roots, and negative if it has one real root and two distinct complex conjugate roots. 

More generally, the discriminant of a univariate polynomial of positive degree is zero if and only if the polynomial has a multiple root. For real coefficients and no multiple roots, the discriminant is positive if the number of non-real roots is a multiple of 4 (including none), and negative otherwise.

Several generalizations are also called discriminant: the discriminant of an algebraic number field; the discriminant of a quadratic form; and more generally, the discriminant of a form, of a homogeneous polynomial, or of a projective hypersurface (these three concepts are essentially equivalent).

Origin
The term "discriminant" was coined in 1851 by the British mathematician James Joseph Sylvester.

Definition

Let 

be a polynomial of degree  (this means ), such that the coefficients  belong to a field, or, more generally, to a commutative ring.
 

Historically, this sign has been chosen such that, over the reals, the discriminant will be positive when all the roots of the polynomial are real. The division by  may not be well defined if the ring of the coefficients contains zero divisors. Such a problem may be avoided by replacing  by 1 in the first column of the Sylvester matrix—before computing the determinant.

Expression in terms of the roots
When the above polynomial is defined over a field, it has  roots, not necessarily all distinct, in any algebraically closed extension of the field. (If the coefficients are real numbers, the roots may be taken in the field of complex numbers, where the fundamental theorem of algebra applies.) 

In terms of the roots, the discriminant is equal to

It is thus the square of the Vandermonde polynomial times .

This expression for the discriminant is often taken as a definition. It makes clear that if the polynomial has a multiple root, then its discriminant is zero, and that, in the case of real coefficients, if all the roots are real and simple, then the discriminant is positive.

Low degrees
The discriminant of a linear polynomial (degree 1) is rarely considered. If needed, it is commonly defined to be equal to 1 (using the usual conventions for the empty product and considering that one of the two blocks of the Sylvester matrix is empty). There is no common convention for the discriminant of a constant polynomial (i.e., polynomial of degree 0).

For small degrees, the discriminant is rather simple (see below), but for higher degrees, it may become unwieldy. For example, the discriminant of a general quartic has 16 terms, that of a quintic has 59 terms, and that of a sextic has 246 terms.
This is OEIS sequence .

Degree 2

The quadratic polynomial  has discriminant

The square root of the discriminant appears in the quadratic formula for the roots of the quadratic polynomial:

where the discriminant is zero if and only if the two roots are equal. If  are real numbers, the polynomial has two distinct real roots if the discriminant is positive, and two complex conjugate roots if it is negative.

If  are rational numbers, then the discriminant is the square of a rational number if and only if the two roots are rational numbers.

Degree 3

The cubic polynomial  has discriminant

In the special case of a depressed cubic polynomial , the discriminant simplifies to

The discriminant is zero if and only if at least two roots are equal. If the coefficients are real numbers, and the discriminant is not zero, the discriminant is positive if the roots are three distinct real numbers, and negative if there is one real root and two complex conjugate roots.

The square root of a quantity strongly related to the discriminant appears in the formulas for the roots of a cubic polynomial.

If the polynomial is irreducible and its coefficients are rational numbers (or belong to a number field), then the discriminant is a square of a rational number (or a number from the number field) if and only if the Galois group of the cubic equation is the cyclic group of order three.

Degree 4

The quartic polynomial

has discriminant

The depressed quartic polynomial

has discriminant

The discriminant is zero if and only if at least two roots are equal. If the coefficients are real numbers and the discriminant is negative, then there are two real roots and two complex conjugate roots. Conversely, if the discriminant is positive, then the roots are either all real or all non-real.

Properties

Zero discriminant
The discriminant of a polynomial over a field is zero if and only if the polynomial has a multiple root in some field extension.

The discriminant of a polynomial over an integral domain is zero if and only if the polynomial and its derivative have a non-constant common divisor.

In characteristic 0, this is equivalent to saying that the polynomial is not square-free (i.e., divisible by the square of a non-constant polynomial).

In nonzero characteristic , the discriminant is zero if and only if the polynomial is not square-free or it has an irreducible factor which is not separable (i.e., the irreducible factor is a polynomial in ).

Invariance under change of the variable
The discriminant of a polynomial is, up to a scaling, invariant under any projective transformation of the variable.

 Invariance by translation:

This results from the expression of the discriminant in terms of the roots
 Invariance by homothety:

This results from the expression in terms of the roots, or of the quasi-homogeneity of the discriminant.
 Invariance by inversion:

Invariance under ring homomorphisms
Let  be a homomorphism of commutative rings. Given a polynomial 

The discriminant is invariant under  in the following sense. If  then 

As the discriminant is defined in terms of a determinant, this property results immediately from the similar property of determinants.

If  then  may be zero or not. One has, when 

When one is only interested in knowing whether a discriminant is zero (as is generally the case in algebraic geometry), these properties may be summarised as:
 if and only if either  or 

This is often interpreted as saying that  if and only if  has a multiple root (possibly at infinity).

Product of polynomials

This property follows immediately by substituting the expression for the resultant, and the discriminant, in terms of the roots of the respective polynomials.

Homogeneity
The discriminant is a homogeneous polynomial in the coefficients; it is also a homogeneous polynomial in the roots and thus quasi-homogeneous in the coefficients.

The discriminant of a polynomial of degree  is homogeneous of degree  in the coefficients. This can be seen two ways.

The discriminant of a polynomial of degree  is homogeneous of degree  in the roots. This follows from the expression of the discriminant in terms of the roots, which is the product of a constant and  squared differences of roots.

This is a consequence of the general fact that every polynomial which is homogeneous and symmetric in the roots may be expressed as a quasi-homogeneous polynomial in the elementary symmetric functions of the roots.

Consider the polynomial

It follows from what precedes that the exponents in every monomial  appearing in the discriminant satisfy the two equations

and

and also the equation

This restricts the possible terms in the discriminant. For the general quadratic polynomial there are only two possibilities and two terms in the discriminant, while the general homogeneous polynomial of degree two in three variables has 6 terms. For the general cubic polynomial, there are five possibilities and five terms in the discriminant, while the general homogeneous polynomial of degree 4 in 5 variables has 70 terms.

For higher degrees, there may be monomials which satisfy above equations and do not appear in the discriminant. The first example is for the quartic polynomial , in which case the monomial  satisfies the equations without appearing in the discriminant.

Real roots
In this section, all polynomials have real coefficients.

It has been seen in  that the sign of the discriminant provides a full information on the nature of the roots for polynomials of degree 2 and 3. For higher degrees, the information provided by the discriminant is less complete, but still useful. More precisely, for a polynomial of degree , one has:
 The polynomial has a multiple root if and only if its discriminant is zero.
 If the discriminant is positive, the number of non-real roots is a multiple of 4. That is, there is a nonnegative integer  such that there are  pairs of complex conjugate roots and  real roots.
 If the discriminant is negative, the number of non-real roots is not a multiple of 4. That is, there is a nonnegative integer  such that there are  pairs of complex conjugate roots and  real roots.

Homogeneous bivariate polynomial

Let

be a homogeneous polynomial of degree  in two indeterminates.

Denoting this quantity by 
one has

and

In this case, above formulas and definition remain valid, if the discriminants are computed as if all polynomials would have the degree . Equivalently, the formulas of  must be used.

Use in algebraic geometry

The typical use of discriminants in algebraic geometry is for studying plane algebraic curves, and more generally algebraic hypersurfaces. Let  be such a curve or hypersurface;  is defined as the zero set of a multivariate polynomial. This polynomial may be considered as a univariate polynomial in one of the indeterminates, with polynomials in the other indeterminates as coefficients. The discriminant with respect to the selected indeterminate defines a hypersurface  in the space of the other indeterminates.

In other words, the computation of the roots of the -discriminant and the -discriminant allows one to compute all of the remarkable points of the curve, except the inflection points.

Generalizations
There are two classes of the concept of discriminant. The first class is the discriminant of an algebraic number field, which, in some cases including quadratic fields, is the discriminant of a polynomial defining the field.

Discriminants of the second class arise for problems depending on coefficients, when degenerate instances or singularities of the problem are characterized by the vanishing of a single polynomial in the coefficients. This is the case for the discriminant of a polynomial, which is zero when two roots collapse. Most of the cases, where such a generalized discriminant is defined, are instances of the following.

Let  be a homogeneous polynomial in  indeterminates over a field of characteristic 0, or of a prime characteristic that does not divide the degree of the polynomial. The polynomial  defines a projective hypersurface, which has singular points if and only the  partial derivatives of  have a nontrivial common zero. The restriction on the characteristic is needed because otherwise a common zero of the partial derivative is not necessarily a zero of the polynomial (see Euler's identity for homogeneous polynomials).

Several other classical types of discriminants, that are instances of the general definition are described in next sections.

Quadratic forms

A quadratic form is a function over a vector space, which is defined over some basis by a homogeneous polynomial of degree 2:

or, in matrix form,

for the  symmetric matrix , the  row vector , and the  column vector .

So, the discriminant of a quadratic form is a special case of the above general definition of a discriminant.

Thus the discriminant is well defined only up to the multiplication by a square. It follows that over the complex numbers, a discriminant is equivalent to 0 or 1. Over the real numbers, a discriminant is equivalent to −1, 0, or 1. Over the rational numbers, a discriminant is equivalent to a unique square-free integer.

By a theorem of Jacobi, a quadratic form over a field of characteristic different from 2 can be expressed, after a linear change of variables, in diagonal form as

More precisely, a quadratic forms on may be expressed as a sum

Equivalently, for any symmetric matrix , there is an elementary matrix  such that  is a diagonal matrix.

Geometrically, the discriminant of a quadratic form in three variables is the equation of a quadratic projective curve. The discriminant is zero if and only if the curve is decomposed in lines (possibly over an algebraically closed extension of the field).

A quadratic form in four variables is the equation of a projective surface. The surface has a singular point if and only its discriminant is zero. In this case, either the surface may be decomposed in planes, or it has a unique singular point, and is a cone or a cylinder. Over the reals, if the discriminant is positive, then the surface either has no real point or has everywhere a negative Gaussian curvature. If the discriminant is negative, the surface has real points, and has a negative Gaussian curvature.

Conic sections
A conic section is a plane curve defined by an implicit equation of the form

where  are real numbers.

Two quadratic forms, and thus two discriminants may be associated to a conic section.

The first quadratic form is

Its discriminant is the determinant

It is zero if the conic section degenerates into two lines, a double line or a single point.

The second discriminant, which is the only one that is considered in many elementary textbooks, is the discriminant of the homogeneous part of degree two of the equation. It is equal to

and determines the shape of the conic section. If this discriminant is negative, the curve either has no real points, or is an ellipse or a circle, or, if degenerated, is reduced to a single point. If the discriminant is zero, the curve is a parabola, or, if degenerated, a double line or two parallel lines. If the discriminant is positive, the curve is a hyperbola, or, if degenerated, a pair of intersecting lines.

Real quadric surfaces
A real quadric surface in the Euclidean space of dimension three is a surface that may be defined as the zeros of a polynomial of degree two in three variables. As for the conic sections there are two discriminants that may be naturally defined. Both are useful for getting information on the nature of a quadric surface.

Let  be a polynomial of degree two in three variables that defines a real quadric surface. The first associated quadratic form,  depends on four variables, and is obtained by homogenizing ; that is

Let us denote its discriminant by 

Let us denote its discriminant by 

If  and the surface has real points, it is either a hyperbolic paraboloid or a one-sheet hyperboloid. In both cases, this is a ruled surface that has a negative Gaussian curvature at every point.

If  the surface is either an ellipsoid or a two-sheet hyperboloid or an elliptic paraboloid. In all cases, it has a positive Gaussian curvature at every point.

If  the surface has a singular point, possibly at infinity. If there is only one singular point, the surface is a cylinder or a cone. If there are several singular points the surface consists of two planes, a double plane or a single line.

When  the sign of  if not 0, does not provide any useful information, as changing  into  does not change the surface, but changes the sign of  However, if  and  the surface is a paraboloid, which is elliptic or hyperbolic, depending on the sign of

Discriminant of an algebraic number field

References

External links
Wolfram Mathworld: Polynomial Discriminant
Planetmath: Discriminant

Polynomials
Conic sections
Quadratic forms
Determinants
Algebraic number theory